On November 30, 1947, an Egged bus on its way to Jerusalem from Netanya was attacked by Arab militants, followed by an attack on another bus, killing seven Jews. It was thought to be retaliation for the Shubaki family assassination, which had taken place 10 days earlier. It was the first attack in the 1947–1948 civil war in Mandatory Palestine, following the UN's adoption of the United Nations Partition Plan for Palestine which took place the day before.

Events 
The first bus was the Jerusalem-bound Egged bus #2094 which had left Netanya around 7:30 AM with 21 passengers. The bus was driving through the now-depopulated village of Fajja when it was intercepted by three Arabs waving, who the bus driver assumed to be hitchhikers. As he slowed down the vehicle he was met with gunfire, derailing the train off the road.

The attackers stormed the bus and shot multiple people. Five Jews were killed, including a 22-year-old woman on her way to her wedding and a man who was killed trying to protect his wife.

Twenty-five minutes after, a second bus going to Hadera received the same treatment. Two passengers were killed.

Mordechai Olmert, the father of future Prime Minister Ehud Olmert was one of the people who survived the second attack.

Aftermath and historical context 
The attack occurred one day after the United Nations voted to establish a Partition Plan for Mandatory Palestine that involved splitting the British-administered region into two states: An Arab state and a Jewish one. An Arab General strike was declared, fueling the crisis. The ambush was also the first attack during the  1947–1948 civil war in Mandatory Palestine.

The attack is portrayed in Israel as a protest against the UN resolution. However, it has been suggested by some historians, including Benny Morris, that it was a retaliation for the Shubaki family assassination, the killing of five Palestinian Arabs by Lehi near Herzliya, ten days' prior to the incident (who were in turn taking revenge because one of the members of the family had informed to the British about LEHI activities).. Morris however noted in a later study that the exact motives were unclear. It was the majority view of the Haganah Intelligence Service that the primary motive of the attackers was retaliation for the Shubaki killings; this was supported by an Arab flyer posted shortly after on walls in Jaffa. According to Israeli investigative journalist Ronen Bergman the attack was committed by forces loyal to Palestinian rebel Hasan Salama.

American academic Robert I. Rotberg also pointed out there was a possibility it was a revenge attack.

References 

November 1947 events in Asia
1947 murders in Asia
1947–1948 civil war in Mandatory Palestine
Mass murder in 1947
Attacks on transport
Massacres in Mandatory Palestine
1947 in Mandatory Palestine
1940s mass shootings in Asia